Johannes Driessler (26 January 1921 in Friedrichsthal, Saarland – 3 May 1998 in Detmold) was a German composer, organist, and lecturer.

Driessler studied composition and organ in Cologne at the Musikhochschule from 1939 to 1940. In November 1940, Driessler enlisted in the military; in 1944 he married Gertrude Ledermann. After World War II, he became a teacher in 1945 in Schondorf am Ammersee. In 1946, he became a lecturer at the Northwest German Academy of Music in Detmold. Here he began writing much church music. He left the academy in 1953 to focus on composition, but returned in 1954, becoming a professor in 1958 and Vice Chancellor in 1959, a post he would retain until 1972.

He was awarded the Westphalian Music Prize in 1959; and in 1962 the Kunstpreis des Saarlandes.

Selected works
Sinfonia Sacra
Dein Reich komme, oratorio, op. 11 (1950)
Claudia amata, lyric opera, op. 17 (premiered 1952 Münster)
Prinzessin Hochmut, fairy-tale opera op. 21 (premiered 1952 Kassel)
Der Unfried, opera (premiered 1957)
Doktor Lucifer Trux, opera (premiered 1958)
Three Small Pieces for cello and piano, op. 8
Vier kleine Stücke für Flöte und Klavier (Four Little Pieces for Flute and Piano), op. 8 no. 2  (1948)
Duo for violin and cello
Fantasy for cello and piano, op. 24 No. 2
Fünf Stücke (5 Pieces) for viola and piano, op. 24 no. 3b (1952)
Sonata for solo viola, op. 3 no. 1 (1946)
20 Choral sonatas, op. 30 (1955)
Altenburger Messe, op. 33 (1955)
Sonata for cello and piano, op. 41 no. 2
Ikarus, sinfonia da camera (1960)
Concerto for string trio and orchestra, op. 54 (1963)
Tripartita for viola and harpsichord, op. 58 no. 3 (1966)
Symphony No. 3, op. 63 (1969)

1921 births
1998 deaths
People from Friedrichsthal
German classical composers
20th-century classical composers
Academic staff of the Hochschule für Musik Detmold
German male classical composers
20th-century German composers
20th-century German male musicians